Leroy Gilbert Jarvis (June 7, 1926 – January 13, 1990) was an American professional baseball player. He debuted at age 17 in Major League Baseball as a catcher for the Brooklyn Dodgers in  during the World War II manpower shortage.  He struck out in his only at bat, but later appeared in another 20 games for the – Pittsburgh Pirates, in addition to having a ten-year playing career in minor league baseball.

He signed with Brooklyn after graduation from Central High School in Oklahoma City. In his one game for the Dodgers, an April 30, 1944, 26–8 defeat at the hands of the New York Giants, Jarvis relieved starting catcher Mickey Owen and fanned against Harry Feldman. He spent the remainder of the 1944 season in the minors, then was drafted by the Pirates that autumn in the Rule 5 draft. After serving in the United States Navy during 1945, the final wartime year, he resumed his baseball career in 1946 by appearing in two games for the Pirates. Jarvis split 1947 between Pittsburgh and the Triple-A Indianapolis Indians, hitting his only MLB home run off Clayton Lambert of the Cincinnati Reds on April 18.

In all, Jarvis made 57 plate appearances in the Majors, with eight hits and seven bases on balls.

References

External links

1926 births
1990 deaths
Albany Senators players
Atlanta Crackers players
Baseball players from Oklahoma
Brooklyn Dodgers players
Indianapolis Indians players
Kansas City Blues (baseball) players
Louisville Colonels (minor league) players
Major League Baseball catchers
Nashville Vols players
Newport News Dodgers players
Pittsburgh Pirates players
Richmond Virginians (minor league) players
San Francisco Seals (baseball) players
Sportspeople from Oklahoma City
Trenton Packers players
Tulsa Oilers (baseball) players
United States Navy personnel of World War II